Enclosure is a 1961 French–Yugoslav drama film directed by Armand Gatti. It was entered into the 2nd Moscow International Film Festival where Gatti won the Silver Prize for Best Director.

Cast
 Hans Christian Blech as Karl
 Jean Négroni as David
 Herbert Wochinz as Scheller
 Tamara Miletic as Anna
 Maks Furijan as Weissenborn
 Stevo Žigon as Dragulavic
 Janez Vrhovec as Walter (as Janez Vrkovec)
 Michel Bouyer as Doctor Crémieux
 Janez Skof as Kapo #1
 Janez Cuk as Kapo #2
 Janko Hocevar as Jova
 Pero Kvrgić as Sanchez
 Lojze Potokar as Police Officer
 Frane Milčinski as Wagner

References

External links
 

1961 films
1961 drama films
French drama films
1960s French-language films
French black-and-white films
Yugoslav black-and-white films
Holocaust films
Yugoslav drama films
1960s French films